Anne-Marie is a 1936 French drama film directed by Raymond Bernard and starring Annabella, Pierre Richard-Willm and Paul Azaïs. If features Annabella as an aspiring young pilot.

The film's sets were designed by the art directors Jean d'Eaubonne and Jean Perrier.

Cast
 Annabella as Anne-Marie 
 Pierre Richard-Willm as L'inventeur 
 Paul Azaïs as Le boxeur 
 Pierre Labry as Le paysan 
 Abel Jacquin as Le détective 
 Christian Gérard as L'amoureux 
 Jean Murat as Le penseur 
 André Carnège as Le général 
 Enrico Glori as Un homme d'affaires 
 Odette Talazac as La bonne

Reception
Writing for The Spectator in 1936, Graham Greene gave the film a mildly good review, describing it as "silly but with some amiable qualities". Commenting that "there is very little to be said for this odd plot", and suggesting that "there is no discoverable theme", Greene nevertheless praised Saint-Exupéry's scenario writing and concluded that "it is chiefly worth seeing for [its] exciting and beautifully directed melodramatic climax".

References

Bibliography 
 Jonathan Driskell. The French Screen Goddess: Film Stardom and the Modern Woman in 1930s France. I.B.Tauris, 2015.

External links 
 

1936 films
1936 drama films
French drama films
1930s French-language films
Films directed by Raymond Bernard
1930s French films